French orthography was already (more or less) fixed and (from a phonological point of view) outdated when its lexicography developed in the late 17th century and the Académie française was mandated to establish an "official" prescriptive norm. Still, there was already much debate at the time opposing the tenets of a traditional, etymological orthography, and supporting those of a reformed, phonological transcription of the language.

César-Pierre Richelet chose the latter (reformed) option when he published the first monolingual French dictionary in 1680, but the  chose to adhere firmly to tradition in the first edition of its dictionary (1694).

Some proposals exist to simplify the existing writing system, but they still fail to gather interest.

16th century

Spelling and punctuation before the 16th century was highly erratic, but the introduction of printing in 1470 provoked the need for uniformity.

Several Renaissance humanists (working with publishers) proposed reforms in French orthography, the most famous being Jacques Peletier du Mans who developed a phonemic-based spelling system and introduced new typographic signs (1550).  Peletier continued to use his system in all his published works, but his reform was not followed.

18th century

—Académie, 1740, using accents for the first time

The third (1740) and fourth (1762) editions of the Académie dictionary were very progressive ones, changing the spelling of about half the words altogether.

Accents, which had been in common use by printers for a long time, were finally adopted by the Académie, and many mute consonants were dropped.

 →  (to be)
 →  (monastic)

Many changes suggested in the fourth edition were later abandoned along with thousands of neologisms added to it.

Very importantly too, subsequent 18th century editions of the dictionary added the letters J and V to the French alphabet in replacement of consonant I and U, fixing many cases of homography.

 →  (vile)

19th century

Many changes were introduced in the sixth edition of the Académie dictionary (1835), mainly under the influence of Voltaire. Most importantly, all oi digraphs that represented  were changed to ai, thus changing the whole imperfect conjugation of all verbs.

 →  (was)

The spelling of some plural words whose singular form ended in D and T was modified to reinsert this mute consonant, so as to bring the plural in morphological alignment with the singular. Only ,  retained the old form, because it was perceived that the singular and the plural had different meanings. The Académie had already tried to introduce a similar reform in 1694, but had given up with their dictionary's second edition.

 →  (parents)

20th century

With important dictionaries published at the turn of the 20th century, such as those of Émile Littré, Pierre Larousse, Arsène Darmesteter, and later Paul Robert, the Académie gradually lost much of its prestige.

Hence, new reforms suggested in 1901, 1935, and 1975 were almost totally ignored, except for the replacement of apostrophes with hyphens in some cases of (potential) elision in 1935.

 →  (grandmother)

Since the 1970s, though, calls for the modernisation of French orthography have grown stronger. In 1989, French prime minister Michel Rocard appointed the Superior Council of the French language to simplify the orthography by regularising it.

Rectifications of 1990  

The council, with the help of some Académie members and observers from Francophone states, published reforms that it called "" on 6 December 1990.

Those "rectifications", instead of changing individual spellings, published general rules or lists of modified words. In total, around 2000 words have seen their spelling changed, and French morphology was also affected.

Hyphens

Numerals are joined with hyphens:

 →  (700,321).

Elements of compound nouns are fused together:
if one element is a verb:  →  (wallet)
in bahuvrihi compounds (where the individual sense of the elements has changed):  →  (midwife)
in onomatopoeias:  →  (quack).

Loan compounds are also fused together:

 →  (hot dog).
 → , aligning the word with its modern English spelling.

Number

Compound nouns joined with hyphens (or fused) make their plural using normal rules, that is adding a final s or x, unless the modifier is an adjective (in which case both elements must agree), or the head is a determined noun, or a proper noun:

 →  (letter scales)

Loanwords also have a regular plural:

 →  (songs)

The  (known as a diaeresis in English) indicating exceptionally that the u is not silent in  + vowel combinations is to be placed on the u instead of on the following vowel. Also, trémas are added to such words where they were not previously used:

 →   (fem. acute)
 →   (ambiguity)
 →   (to argue)

A  is also added to a u following an  added to soften a g, to prevent the eu combination being read as :

 →   (wager)

Accents

Verbs with their infinitive in éCer (where C can be any consonant) change their é to è in the future and conditional:

 →   (I shall give up)

Additionally, verbs ending in e placed before an inverted subject "je" change their e to è instead of é:

 →   (do I like?)

Circumflex accents are removed on i and u if they are not needed to distinguish between homographs. They are retained in the simple past and subjunctive of verbs:

 →  (driven), but  unchanged (he must have driven), and

Wherever accents are missing or wrong because of past errors or omissions or a change of pronunciation, they are added or changed:

 →   (to receive – stolen goods)
 →   (event)

Accents are also added to loanwords where dictated by French pronunciation:

 →   (diesel)

Schwa changing into open e

 →  (I label)

This applies also when those verbs are nominalized using the suffix :

 →  (pile)

Past participle agreement

Notwithstanding the normal rules (see French verbs), the past participle  followed by an infinitive never agrees with the object:

 →  (I let them go)

This is an alleged simplification of the rules governing the agreement as applied to a past participle followed by an infinitive. The participle  already followed an identical rule.

Miscellaneous

Many phenomena were considered as "anomalies" and thus "corrected". Some "families" of words from the same root showing inconsistent spellings were uniformized on the model of the most usual word in the "family".

 →  (idiocy)

This rule was also extended to suffixes in two cases, actually changing them into totally different morphemes altogether:

 →  (haunch)
 →  (leveret)

Isolated words were adjusted to follow older reform where they had been omitted:

 →  (sickly sweet)
 →  (onion)

Lastly, some words have simply seen their spelling simplified, or fixed when it was uncertain:

 →  (mess)
 →  (punch)

Application

These "rectifications" were supposed to be applied beginning in 1991 but, following a period of agitation and the publication of many books such as the Union of copy editors' attacking new rules one by one, André Goosse's defending them, or Josette Rey-Debove's accepting a few (that have been added, as alternative spellings, to Le Robert), they appeared to have become, for a while, dead proposals.

21st century
In 2004, an international institutional effort to revive the 1990 spelling reforms arose. Notably, a French-Belgian-Swiss association was set up to promote reform. In July of the same year, Microsoft announced that the French version of their applications would soon comply with the new spelling rules. On 23 March 2005, a version of Encarta was published using the new spelling, and, on 14 April 2005, an update of Microsoft Office was offered.

Officially, French people, including public workers, are free for an undetermined length of time to continue using the old spelling. The new spelling is "recommended", but both old and new are considered correct.

More and more publications are modernizing spelling. Le Forum, from the Université de Montréal, and Les Éditions Perce-Neige have adopted the new spelling.

In 2009, several major Belgian publishing groups began applying the new spelling in their online publications.

The 2009 edition of the  incorporates most of the changes.  There are 6000 words that have both the traditional and alternative spellings. The 2011 edition of the Dictionnaire Larousse incorporates all of the changes.

On 3 February 2016, a report by French television channel TF1 that the reforms would be applied from the next school year caused wide outrage.

There are fringe movements to reform the language further: for example, that which is led  by the linguist Mickael Korvin who would like to radically simplify French, by eliminating accents, punctuation and capital letters, and, in 2016 inventing a new way to spell French called nouvofrancet.

See also

Circumflex in French
French orthography

References

External links
http://www.orthographe-recommandee.info/ (in French)
RENOUVO (Réseau pour la nouvelle orthographe du français, in French)
À la découverte de la nouvelle orthographe (Communauté française de Belgique, in French)

 
History of the French language
Académie Française